Colin Peter Morgan (7 July 1939 – 5 July 2010) was a British poet, lyricist and television documentary author and presenter.

Born in Leigh, Lancashire, Morgan began his career as a poet in the mid-1950s when he was 16 and living alone in London. He entered the British Army and rose to the rank of infantry platoon commander while serving with the Loyal Regiment (North Lancashire) in West Germany, but began to question this career choice. By the mid-1960s he had become a pacifist and resigned his commission. In 1964 he moved to Edinburgh, where he started to publish his poems and to perform recitals in public. He returned to the North of England in 1971, but this time to Yorkshire's North Riding, to live and work in the fishing village of Robin Hood's Bay, near Whitby.

Over the years Morgan emphasised the oral tradition of poetry and song. Some of his poems have been set to music and have been recorded by such artists as Al Stewart ("My Enemies Have Sweet Voices" on the 1970 Zero She Flies album), the McCalmans and most recently the Levellers, by 'Is This Art'. (During his 1999 UK tour, Al Stewart invited Morgan to read the lyrics as he performed the above song in the City Varieties music hall show at Leeds on 7 November).

Morgan's BBC Television series A Voyage Between Two Seas (1983) presented a journey across Northern England via the region's waterways. His later TV programme The Grain Run was about the Roman supply route from East Anglia to the Yorkshire town of Aldborough.

Works
Poetry collections
 1973: The Grey Mare Being the Better Steed, Martin Secker & Warburg
 1979: The Spring Collection, Secker & Warburg
 1980: One Greek Alphabet, including a sequence of poems commissioned by the Ilkley Literature Festival; illustrated by Hella Basu; Ceolfrith Press
 1983: A Winter Visitor, Secker & Warburg
 2005: August Light 

Other
 1968: "A Big Hat Or What?", his first pamphlet, the Kevin Press
 1971: work included in Poetry: Introduction 2, part of Faber & Faber's "Poetry: Introduction" series
 2001: Talking Cello, writer, researcher and presenter for the programme on BBC Radio 4 in collaboration with the cellist Tony Moore, featuring a number of Morgan's poems
 The Other Wittgenstein, writer, researcher and presenter for the programme on BBC Radio 4
 Away, pamphlet published in 2003 by Driftwood Publications, 44a Merrilocks Road, Blundellsands, Liverpool L23 6UW

References

External links
Pete Morgan at The Shed
Page-27 report on 1999 tour
Review by Carol Ann Duffy
List of Published Works

1939 births
2010 deaths
British modernist poets
British pacifists
English television presenters
Loyal Regiment officers
People from Leigh, Greater Manchester
English male poets
20th-century English poets
20th-century English male writers